Abdulraof A. Macacua, also known by his nom de guerre Sammy Gambar, is a Filipino politician who is the Executive Secretary and Environment Minister of Bangsamoro.

Early life
Macacua was born on September 13, 1957, to Salma B. Macacua and Macacua W. Tubo-Tubo in Gambar in Kabuntalan, Cotabato (now in Maguindanao).

Moro Islamic Liberation Front
In 1971, Macacua joined the Moro independence movement and adopted the nom de guerre Sammy Gambar. He fought for self-determination of the Moro people under the Moro Islamic Liberation Front's (MILF) armed wing, the Bangsamoro Islamic Armed Forces (BIAF). He underwent training both within the Philippines and abroad and rose the rank of the MILF. He later became Chief-of-Staff of the BIAF and a member of the MILF Peace Negotiating Panel which engaged in peace talks with the Philippine national government. He also became a member of the Bangsamoro Transition Commission, a government body tasked to create an organic law for a Bangsamoro autonomous region.

Bangsamoro government
Macacua became part of the regional government of Bangsamoro which superseded the Autonomous Region in Muslim Mindanao (ARMM). He was appointed as part of the Bangsamoro Transition Authority and became a member of the interim Bangsamoro Parliament. As part of the Bangsamoro Cabinet he was tasked to head the Ministry of Environment, Natural Resources and Energy and serve as concurrent Executive Secretary. As environment minister, he overlooked the implementation of the Kayod sa Bangsamoro program, which encouraged backyard farming in the region.

References

Filipino Muslims
People from Maguindanao
Living people
Members of the Bangsamoro Transition Authority Parliament
1957 births
Moro Islamic Liberation Front members